Patrick Trémeau (born September 27, 1963) is a French serial rapist, active in the 11th and 20th arrondissements of Paris during the 1990s. Nicknamed The Parking Rapist, he prowled mainly at night, attacking women in underground car parks under the threat of a knife, before raping them.

Patrick Trémeau was sentenced to 16 years' imprisonment in 1998. He was released in May 2005 after 10 years of detention, whereupon he reoffended and was arrested in September of that same year. At the same time, a law was passed concerning recidivism, and Trémeau was given 20 years' imprisonment with a 10-year imprisonment term in February 2009.

Biography 
Patrick Trémeau came from a poor family, with two other children. He lived with his mother Janine, a housekeeper, in the city of Hautes-Mardelles in Brunoy, Essonne. He did not know his father, and later claimed that his father-in-law hit and abused him. Patrick was handed over to various different homes from a very young age, with his mother describing him as "the devil's envoy". Despite being unstable, suffering from nervous disorders and failing academically, Trémeau was nevertheless considered friendly and talented with manual labor. In the early 1980s, he earned a plumbing certificate, finding work easily, and doing in a manner considered satisfactory by his employers.

Early crimes 
In 1984, Trémeau was arrested for masturbating in front of a hitchhiker. He was handed a 18-month sentence in prison, 10 of which were suspended for indecent assault. He was released after serving the sentence.

In 1987, he raped a woman in Créteil. For this crime, he was given a 7-year sentence by the Assize Court of Val-de-Marne, for rape under the threat of a weapon.

In 1990, Trémeau was released from prison, and was hired as a storekeeper at a hardware store. His behavior towards his female colleagues was not abnormal, with Patrick successfully seducing several of them, but they quickly left him, which greatly affected Trémeau, who couldn't stand break-ups. Everything went well until 1992, where he made several suicide attempts because of break-ups, before abruptly quitting his job.

Rapes from 1993 to 1995 
Between April 1993 and March 1995, Trémeau raped 8 women and tried to violate 5 others, always in the same manner. His victims were all women, from 20 to 35 years, with long hair (primarily brunettes), always with a job that made them return late at night. When he spotted a victim, Trémeau followed them to the building and usually waited for them to come back and park their car in the parking lot. Afterwards, he threatened them with a knife and raped them in the dark, where he couldn't be seen. His assaults always took place between midnight and 4 a.m., in the underground car parks of the 11th and 20th arrondissements of Paris. At the beginning of the aggressions, he would always be menacing, but once the victim subjected, his behavior changed radically and his words became soft, with him embracing and even complimenting the victim. When he raped, he always used a condom, and would sometimes throw the wrapper on the crime scene, without leaving fingerprints. In March 1995, he raped a woman almost every week.

The police investigation was very difficult, because there was no exploitable index, and the composite sketches were imprecise. At the same time, in the eastern sector of Paris, there was another predator raging: Guy Georges. Some of Georges' crimes also took place in underground car parks. For a while, the police believed that this was the work of a single individual, but only after arresting Guy did they realise that there were two different perpetrators, operating in the same geographical area.

Patrick Trémeau was arrested in March 1995, for breaking cars in a parking lot. At the police station, during his interrogation, a policeman noticed that he was trying to get rid of an empty condom wrapper. At the same time during the interview, Trémeau's last victim, Gladys, was filing a rape complaint. She mentioned that she very well saw that her rapist wore yellow shoes, a detail which caught the attention of Commandant Bertrand, who noticed that Patrick Trémeau also wore yellow shoes. Officers then made him take off his shoes and brought them to the office, where Gladys was, and she immediately recognized them. The police conducted a lineup, and among the group of men, through a beam splitter, Gladys immediately pointed to her rapist: Patrick Trémeau. She identified him because she remembered his gaze. Subsequently, the other victims of Trémeau also identified him, some managing to do it only by hearing his voice.

Patrick Trémeau almost instantly confessed to all the rapes he committed while in custody, but denied having threatened the women with a knife.

Trial and sentence 
The trial began in October 1998, to almost total indifference: no journalist as present to cover the event, despite the high number of victims (13). The last of said victims was not informed about the holding of the trial and, thus, could be a civil party. After the trial, Trémeau was sentenced to 16 years' imprisonment, together with a minimum sentence of 8 years.

Detention and release 
In the years following his conviction, Patrick Trémeau repeatedly asked for early release, to no avail. On May 7, 2005, after spending 10 years in prison, he was released from the prison in Melun, near the end of the sentence. He was put on parole, but without any obligation to report his situation to a social worker.

Recidivism and arrest 
On June 5, 2005, a 24-year-old woman named Cecilia was attacked and raped in the garbage room of her apartment building, in the 16th arrondissement of Paris. On June 20, another young woman was attacked in her building on Thionville Street, in the 19th arrondissement (the circumstances of this attack remain unclear), and finally, a third victim was assaulted on September 17, 2005. The Judicial Police of Paris, who were in charge of these rape cases, came to the certainty that these women had been attacked by the same rapist that plagued the city 10 years earlier: Patrick Trémeau. Two inspectors went to his mother's home, finding him there. Arrested, Patrick made a tearful confession, but denied raping Cecilia, the first victim.

Second trial 
Trémeau's second trial began on February 3, 2009. Almost all of the affected victims, except two, were present. During the trial, it appeared that Trémeau seemed regretful about what he did to the victims. Henri Leclerc, his attorney, emphasized on that fact, as well as his client's difficult childhood (the alleged violence at the hands of his father-in-law and by staff members at the different homes).The verdict condemned Trémeau to 20 years' imprisonment (as advocated by advocate general Philippe Bilger, a starch believer of redemption and of Patrick's truthful remorse), with a 10-year sentence of medical care after his release.

The victims' fight 
Marie-Ange Le Boulaire, Anne Bordier and others from Trémeau's victims denounced his release, warning that he had no socio-judicial control and would likely reoffend.

References

Bibliography 

 The Rape by Marie-Ange Le Boulaire, 190 pages, published on December 2, 2004 by J'ai lu

External links 

 "The victims of a rapist" Article by Nelly Terrier and Timothée Boutry published on September 27, 2005 in Le Parisien.
 "Assessing how dangerous are rapists" Article by Gaël Lyonnet published on September 27, 2005 in L'Humanité.
 "Trémeau affair, repressive alibi?" Article by Laurent Mouloud published on September 27, 2005 in L'Humanité.
 "The debate on recidivism relaunched after two cases" Article by Nathalie Guibert published on September 27, 2005 in Le Monde.
 "Justice" Article by Emmanuelle Reju published on September 27, 2005 in La Croix.
 "Patrick Trémeau recounts his journey as a rapist" Article published on February 3, 2009 on LCI.
 "Trémeau trial: the rapist is thought to be treated" Article published on February 3, 2009 in Le Parisien.
 "The terrible story of a victim of the 'Parking Rapist'" Article published on February 5, 2009 in Le Parisien.
 "Melun. The days of the rapist with 18 victims are no longer in danger" Article published on August 10, 2017 in Le Parisien.

Documentaries 
Documentaries used as sources for writing this article:

 "Patrick Trémeau, the Parking Rapist" in October 2009 and March 2011 in "Enter the Accused", presented by Christophe Hondelatte on France 2. 
 "Trémeau case: the Parking Rapist" (first report) on February 20, 2016 in "Chroniques criminelles" on NT1.

Radio 

 "Patrick Trémeau, the Parking Rapist" on December 27, 2013 and February 19, 2016 in "L'Heure du crime", presented by Jacques Pradel on RTL.

See also

External links 
 Archives of the INA

Living people
1963 births
French rapists
French people convicted of sexual assault
Prisoners and detainees of France
People from Essonne